Urocerus is a genus of horntails in the family Siricidae. There are about eight described species in Urocerus.

Species
These species belong to the genus Urocerus:
 Urocerus albicornis (Fabricius, 1781) g b (white horned horntail)
 Urocerus californicus Norton, 1869 g b
 Urocerus cressoni Norton, 1864 g b (black and red horntail)
 Urocerus flavicornis Fabricius, 1781 g b (yellow-horned horntail wasp)
 Urocerus franzinii C.Pesarini & F.Pesarini, 1977 g
 Urocerus gigas (Linnaeus, 1758) b (giant woodwasp)
 Urocerus japonicus (Smith, 1874)  (Japanese horntail)
 Urocerus sah (Mocsáry, 1881) g
Data sources: i = ITIS, c = Catalogue of Life, g = GBIF, b = Bugguide.net

References

Further reading

External links

 

Siricidae